The Peugeot Proxima is a concept car, designed, developed and built by French manufacturer Peugeot, and produced in 1986.

History
It was crowned with a double world rally championship title in 1985 and 1986 with its Peugeot 205 Turbo 16, Peugeot presented this concept car at the 1986 Paris Motor Show. It succeeded the 1984 Peugeot Quasar (the manufacturer's first prototype) and precedes the Peugeot Oxia of 1988, and Peugeot 905 of 1990  Inspired by astronautics, science fiction, and cutting-edge avant-garde techniques of the 1980s, it is named after the star Proxima Centauri, closest to the sun.

The bodywork of this 2+2 coupé weighing  was created by the Peugeot Style center and inspired by the work of designer Luigi Colani 3. It comprises composite materials, including resins and carbon fiber, and a large polycarbonate glazed cockpit.

A traction control solution automatically adapts the transmission between propulsion and four-wheel drive when a risk of rear wheel slippage is detected.

Two onboard computers and five high-definition color screens assist the driver with one of the first prototypes of a satellite navigation system (GPS). The heat produced by the sun on the sizeable glazed dome of the cockpit is cooled when stationary by a temperature control system powered by a solar panel on the rear of the car.

References 

Quasar